CIM Schema is a computer specification, part of Common Information Model standard, and created by the Distributed Management Task Force.

It is a conceptual diagram made of classes, attributes, relations between these classes and inheritances, defined in the world of software and hardware. This set of objects and their relations is a conceptual framework for describing computer elements and organizing  information about the managed environment.

This schema is the basis of other DMTF standards such as WBEM, SMASH or SMI-S for storage management.

Extensibility
The CIM schema is object-based and extensible, allowing manufacturers to represent their equipment using the elements defined in the core classes of CIM schema. For this, manufacturers provide software extensions called providers, which supplement existing classes by deriving them and adding new attributes.

Examples of common core classes
 CIM_ComputerSystem for a computer host
 CIM_DataFile: Computer file
 CIM_Directory: Files directory
 CIM_DiskPartition: disk partition
 CIM_FIFOPipeFile: Named pipes
 CIM_OperatingSystem: Operating system
 CIM_Process: Computer process
 CIM_SqlTable: Database table
 CIM_SqlTrigger: Database trigger

References

DMTF standards
Open standards
Computer standards